The American University of Kurdistan (AUK) (Zanîngeha Emrîkî ya Kurdistanê) is a public, not-for-profit special status, university in Duhok, Kurdistan Region of Iraq. It was founded in 2014 to provide comprehensive liberal arts education and to encourage cross-disciplinary research in the region.

Universities in Kurdistan Region (Iraq)
Dohuk Governorate
International schools in Iraq
Private universities and colleges
Educational institutions established in 2014
2014 establishments in Iraqi Kurdistan